Leonard ("Leo") François Gerard Bosschart (24 August 1888 in Kota Radja, Dutch East Indies – 9 May 1951 in Hoboken, Antwerp, Belgium) was a football player from the Netherlands, who captained his home country at the 1920 Summer Olympics in Antwerp, Belgium as captain. There he won the bronze medal with the Netherlands national football team.

Club career
A versatile midfielder, Bosschart played for Quick.

International career
Bosschart made his debut for Netherlands in a December 1909 friendly match against England and earned a total of 19 caps, scoring 1 goal. His final international was a September 1920 friendly against Spain.

Personal life
Born in the Dutch East Indies to Francois Guilleaume Jacques Bosschart and Anna Catharina Gerardina Eras, Bosschart studied engineering in Delft and became chief engineer at Burgenhout in Rotterdam and director of the Conrad shipyard. From 1938 until his death in 1951, Bosschart was director of the John Cockerill shipyard in Hoboken, Belgium.

References

External links
 

  Dutch Olympic Committee

1888 births
1951 deaths
People from Banda Aceh
Association football midfielders
Dutch footballers
Footballers at the 1920 Summer Olympics
Olympic footballers of the Netherlands
Olympic bronze medalists for the Netherlands
Netherlands international footballers
Olympic medalists in football
20th-century Dutch engineers
Marine engineers
Dutch businesspeople in shipping
Medalists at the 1920 Summer Olympics
H.V. & C.V. Quick players
Dutch people of the Dutch East Indies